The Rajat Prapat is a waterfall in Narmadapuram district in the Indian state of Madhya Pradesh. It is the 30th highest waterfall in India.

The falls

Etymology
When sunlight falls on it, it shines as silver, that is why it is known as Rajat Prapat or Silver Fall. In Hindi, ‘rajat’ means silver and ‘prapat’ means falls.

Location
The Rajat Prapat is located at Pachmarhi, known as the Queen of Satpura, in Narmadapuram district. It is 10 min walk over rocks and boulders from Apsara Vihar.

See also
List of waterfalls in India
List of waterfalls in India by height

References

Waterfalls of Madhya Pradesh
Tourist attractions in Narmadapuram district
Pachmarhi